DSN1, MIND kinetochore complex component, homolog (S. cerevisiae), also known as DSN1 or MIS13, is a protein which in humans encoded by the DSN1 gene.

Function
DSN1 along with MIS12, DC8, PMF1, CBX5, ZWINT is a component of the kinetochore-associated multiprotein complex which is required for correct chromosome alignment during the metaphase of cell mitosis.

Interactions
DSN1 has been shown to interact with NSL1 and MIS12.

References

Further reading